The following is a list of notable events and releases of the year 1900 in Norwegian music.

Events

Deaths

 January
 7 – Augusta Schrumpf (86), dramatic actress and operatic soprano.

Births

See also
 1900 in Norway
 Music of Norway

References

 
Norwegian music
Norwegian
Music
1900s in Norwegian music